Byron John Joseph Simpson (1917 – 9 April 1944) was an Australian rugby league footballer who played in the 1930s. He was killed in World War II.

Career
A former schoolboy rugby player from St. Josephs College, Jack Simpson played rugby league with St. George Dragons in 1936, playing a total of 3 first grade games.

War service and death
Jack Simpson enlisted in the RAAF in 1942. On 9 April 1944, an Avro Lancaster took off from RAF Binbrook with 7 aboard, among them Flight Sergeant Simpson, serving as an air bomber on the flight. The bomber's objective was to lay mines in the Baltic Sea, but the Lancaster crashed six minutes after take-off, killing all aboard.

References

1917 births
1944 deaths
Australian military personnel killed in World War II
Australian rugby league players
Royal Australian Air Force airmen
Royal Australian Air Force personnel of World War II
St. George Dragons players
Rugby league halfbacks